Stephanie Gannon is a camogie player, Young Player of the Year award winner in 2004. Poc Fada champion that year, and All Ireland club finalist with Athenry in 2009.

Honours
She won National League medals in 2002 and 2005,2005 when she ran the length of the field from goal to take a penalty which was saved.  She won the Poc Fada competition in 2004.

References

Living people
Camogie goalkeepers
Galway camogie players
Year of birth missing (living people)